One with the Sun is the second studio album by New York City electronica duo Shy Child. The album is centered on the sun, with many songs containing lyrical themes about summer and sunshine.

Track listing

Standard Edition
 "Noise Won't Stop"
 "Sunshine"
 "Summer"
 "Break Your Neck"
 "Technicrats"
 "Echo And Throb"
 "Institutions"
 "One With The Sun"
 "Take Me There"

Different mixes of tracks 1 and 3 are also on the band's third album, Noise Won't Stop.

Japanese Edition Bonus Tracks
 "Summer (Com.A Winter Mix)"
 "Technicrats (Milky-Chu Shy Na Chu Remix)"

2004 albums
Shy Child albums